Charles Brian Hegarty (born  in Hawick, Scotland) is a Scottish former rugby union footballer of the 1970s.

He also played for Hawick RFC.

He is the son of John Hegarty, who was also capped for Scotland.

References

 Bath, Richard (ed.) The Scotland Rugby Miscellany (Vision Sports Publishing Ltd, 2007 )

External links
Statistics at en.espn.co.uk

1950 births
Living people
Hawick RFC players
Place of birth missing (living people)
Rugby union flankers
Rugby union players from Hawick
Scotland international rugby union players
Scottish rugby union players